Phascus is a genus of leaf beetles in the subfamily Eumolpinae. It is known from Africa and Saudi Arabia.

Species
 Phascus bicolor Weise, 1904
 Phascus bredoi Burgeon, 1941
 Phascus chopardi (Pic, 1950)
 Phascus cruciatus Selman, 1972
 Phascus denisoffi Selman, 1972
 Phascus fulvus Lefèvre, 1884
 Phascus instriatus (Pic, 1949)
 Phascus lineatocollis Burgeon, 1941
 Phascus martini Selman, 1972
 Phascus multisulcatus Burgeon, 1941
 Phascus occidentalis Weise, 1912
 Phascus pallidus Lefèvre, 1884
 Phascus pilosus Burgeon, 1941
 Phascus reticulaticollis Burgeon, 1941
 Phascus ruandanus Burgeon, 1941
 Phascus shoemakeri Selman, 1972
 Phascus suturalis Burgeon, 1941

References

Eumolpinae
Chrysomelidae genera
Beetles of Africa
Beetles of Asia
Insects of the Arabian Peninsula
Taxa named by Édouard Lefèvre